The Duckabush River is located in the Olympic Peninsula in Washington, United States. It rises near Mount Duckabush and Mount Steel in the Olympic Mountains within the Olympic National Park and drains to Hood Canal, an arm of Puget Sound.

The name "Duckabush" comes from the Twana placename /dəxʷyabús/, meaning "place of the crooked-jaw salmon".

See also
List of Washington rivers

References

External links
National Park Service - Olympic National Park

Rivers of Washington (state)
Rivers of Jefferson County, Washington
Washington placenames of Native American origin